Milena Strnadová (née Matejkovicová; born 23 May 1961 in Ústí nad Labem) is a Czech former track and field athlete who competed for Czechoslovakia in the 400 metres and 800 metres events.

She enjoyed international success in her early twenties with silver medal wins behind East German opposition as part of the Czechoslovak women's 4 × 400 metres relay team, first at the 1982 European Athletics Championships (alongside Věra Tylová, Taťána Kocembová and Jarmila Kratochvílová) and then at the 1983 World Championships in Athletics (where Zuzana Moravčíková replaced Tylová). At the latter event the team set a Czechoslovak national record of 3:20.32 minutes, which still stands as the Czech record.

Competing individually, Strnadová reached two major outdoor finals in the 800 m, placing seventh at the 1983 World Championships and fifth at the 1986 European Athletics Championships. Her greatest individual achievement was at the 1984 European Athletics Indoor Championships, where she won a gold medal in the 800 m with a championship record time of 1:59.52 minutes. This remained as the record for 18 years before being bettered by Slovenia's Jolanda Ceplak in 2002. She was runner-up to her world record-breaking compatriot Kratochvílová at the 1985 IAAF Grand Prix Final, and won full points for her country at the European Cup B Final in 1991. Her last international appearances were as semi-finalist at the 1991 World Championships in Athletics and 1992 European Athletics Indoor Championships.

She was a four-time national champion covering three disciplines, winning the 800 m (twice) and 400 m at the national indoor championships and having her sole outdoor title over 1500 metres in 1989.

Personal bests
400 metres – 51.88 (1983)
800 metres – 1:57.28 (1983)

International competitions

National titles
Czechoslovak Athletics Championships
1500 m: 1989
Czechoslovak Indoor Athletics Championships
400 m: 1992
800 m: 1986, 1991

See also
List of World Championships in Athletics medalists (women)
List of European Athletics Championships medalists (women)

References

External links

Living people
1961 births
Sportspeople from Ústí nad Labem
Czech female sprinters
Czech female middle-distance runners
Czechoslovak female sprinters
Czechoslovak female middle-distance runners
World Athletics Championships athletes for Czechoslovakia
World Athletics Championships medalists
European Athletics Championships medalists
Competitors at the 1986 Goodwill Games